Čiflik or Çiflik may refer to:
 Chiflik (Ottoman Empire), an Ottoman system of land management

Places 
Albania
 Çiflik, a village in Konispol Municipality

North Macedonia
 Čiflik, Češinovo-Obleševo
 Čiflik, Delčevo, a village in Delčevo Municipality
 Čiflik, Demir Kapija
 Čiflik, Pehčevo
 Čiflik, Sopište
 Čiflik, Želino

Serbia
 Čiflik, Serbia, a village in Bela Palanka Municipality

See also
 Chiflik (disambiguation)
 Čifluk (disambiguation)
 Čitluk (disambiguation)